Gonzalo Fernando Camardón (born 19 December 1970 in Buenos Aires) is a former Argentine rugby union footballer and a current coach. He played as a scrum-half and as a wing.

He played for Alumni.

Camardon had 41 caps for Argentina, from 1990 to 2002, scoring 10 tries, 49 points in aggregate. He was selected for the 1991 Rugby World Cup finals, playing three matches, and for the 1999 Rugby World Cup finals, playing this time five matches.

He was the head coach of Uruguay in the qualifyings for the 2011 Rugby World Cup, but missed the final place in dispute.

External links

1970 births
Living people
Argentine rugby union players
Argentine rugby union coaches
Rugby union scrum-halves
Rugby union wings
Rugby Roma Olimpic players
Argentina international rugby union players
Asociación Alumni players
Argentina international rugby sevens players
Rugby union players from Buenos Aires
Uruguay national rugby union team coaches
Argentine expatriate sportspeople in Uruguay
Argentine expatriate sportspeople in Italy
Expatriate rugby union players in Italy
Argentine expatriate rugby union players